Kafr Ni'ma is a Palestinian town in the Ramallah and al-Bireh Governorate, located 13 kilometers northwest of Ramallah in the northern West Bank.  According to the Palestinian Central Bureau of Statistics (PCBS), the town had a population of 3,750 inhabitants in 2007.

Location

History
Sherds from the Iron Age II, Hellenistic, Roman, Byzantine and  Mamluk eras have been found here.

Ottoman  era
Kafr Ni'ma   was incorporated into the Ottoman Empire in 1517 with all of Palestine, and in 1596 it appeared in the  tax registers as being in the nahiya (subdistrict) of al-Quds (Jerusalem) in the liwa (district) of al-Quds. It had a population of 9 households,  all Muslims. They paid a fixed tax-rate of 33.3 % on agricultural products, including wheat, barley,  olive trees, vineyards, fruit trees, goats and beehives, in addition to occasional revenues; a total of 4,100 akçe. 13/24 of the revenue went to a waqf (religious endowment), the rest was  ziamet land.

In 1838, Kefr Na'meh  was noted as a Muslim village in the District of Beni Harith, north of Jerusalem. An Ottoman village list of about 1870 counted a population of 353 in 88 houses, though  the population count included men only. 

In 1882, the PEF's Survey of Western Palestine described Kefr Nameh as: "a  village of smaller  size with a well to the south, on the side of hill, with olives." In 1896 the population of Kefr Na'me was estimated to be about 657 persons.

British Mandate era
In the 1922 census of Palestine conducted  by the British Mandate authorities, the village, called Kufr Ne'meh, had a population of 517, all  Muslims, increasing in the 1931 census to 681 inhabitants, in 170 houses.

In the 1945 statistics the population was 780 Muslims,   while the total land area was 10,286 dunams, according to an official land and population survey. Of  this,  5,363  were allocated  for plantations and irrigable land, 2,148 for cereals, while 31 dunams were classified as built-up areas.

Jordanian era
In the wake of the 1948 Arab–Israeli War, and after the 1949 Armistice Agreements, Kafr Ni'ma came  under Jordanian rule.

The Jordanian census of 1961 found 1,065 inhabitants in Kafr Ni'ma.

1967-present
Since the Six-Day War in 1967, Kafr Ni'ma has been under Israeli occupation.   

After the 1995 accords, 70.2% of  Kafr Nima  land is defined as Area B land, while the remaining 29.8% is defined as Area C.

Notable people

References

Bibliography

External links
Welcome To Kafr Ni'ma
Kafr Ni’ma, Welcome to Palestine
Survey of Western Palestine, Map 14:   IAA,  Wikimedia commons
Kafr Ni’ma Village (fact sheet),  Applied Research Institute–Jerusalem (ARIJ)
Kafr Ni’ma Village profile, ARIJ
Kafr Ni’ma  aerial photo, ARIJ

Villages in the West Bank
Ramallah and al-Bireh Governorate
Municipalities of the State of Palestine